Pasanda, also called Parche, is a popular dish from the Indian subcontinent, notably North India, Rampur, Hyderabadi and Pakistani, derived from a meal served in the court of the Mughal emperors. The word is a variation on the Hindi-Urdu word "pasande" meaning "favourite", which refers to the prime cuts of meat traditionally used in the dish.

Ingredients and preparation
Pasanda was originally made with leg of lamb or goat flattened into strips, marinated, and fried in a dish with seasoning. In Pakistan, Pasanday is usually made from pot roast beef fillets flattened into strips. In the present day, pasanda is also made with chicken and king prawns; in each case, the process and ingredients remain generally the same.

After the meat is cut and flattened, it is placed in a marinade consisting of yogurt, chili powder, and numerous spices and seasonings, which commonly include cumin, peppercorn, cardamom, and garlic. After a few hours of marination, the meat is placed in a saucepan with the other ingredients that make up the "pasanda" itself—onions, coriander, chillies, and sometimes cinnamon or black pepper—then fried for 30 minutes to an hour. The dish may be garnished with tomatoes or almonds (in which case it is known as badaam pasanda). It is often served with white rice or naan on the side.

History 
Though its invention is ascribed to the Mughal court, the recipe may have been a development of pre-existing cooking techniques, with a similar method of preparation being described in the Manasollasa of the 12th century AD.

Variants
Although pasanda is usually served as a meat dish, it may also be prepared in kebab form. Reflecting the dish's flavour and its connection with the almond, pasanda also refers to a mild curry sauce made with cream, coconut milk or yoghurt and almonds.

See also
 Paneer Pasanda Recipe
 List of lamb dishes
 Pakistani meat dishes

References

Indian curries
Indian meat dishes
Lamb dishes
Mughlai cuisine
Pakistani curries
Pakistani meat dishes
Uttar Pradeshi cuisine
Yogurt-based dishes
Spicy foods
Almond dishes
Goat dishes